Hesperetin is the 4'-methoxy derivative of eriodictyol, a flavanone. Hesperetin's 7-O-glycoside, hesperidin, is a naturally occurring flavanon-glycoside, the main flavonoid in lemons and sweet oranges. Hesperetin (and naringenin, the parent flavanone of naringin) are not found to a significant extent in Citrus spp.

Glycosides 
A variety of glycosides of hesperetin are known, including:
 Hesperidin (hesperetin-7-O-rutinoside) is a water-insoluble flavonoid glycoside whose solubility is below 5 μg/ml in water. Hesperidin is found in citrus fruits and upon ingestion it releases its aglycone, hesperetin.
 Neohesperidin is the 7-O-neohesperidoside of hesperetin.
 Hesperetin-7-O-α-L-Rhamnopyranoside (CAS 66513-83-5) is found in the roots of clammy cherry (Cordia obliqua a.k.a. Cordia obliqua var. wallichii).

Metabolism 
Hesperidin 6-O-α-L-rhamnosyl-β-D-glucosidase is an enzyme that uses hesperidin and H2O to produce hesperetin and rutinose. It is found in the hyphomycetes species Stilbella fimetaria.

Effects 
Hesperetin was found to be affecting the slow inactivation phase of inward sodium current channels (INa) and therefore could be used as a template to develop drugs against lethal cardiac arrhythmias in LQT3. Hesperetin also inhibits TRPM3 channels.

References

External links

Aromatase inhibitors
O-methylated flavanones
Flavonoids found in Rutaceae
3-Hydroxypropenals